Castello is a surname. Notable people with the surname include:

Bernardo Castello (1557–1629), Italian Mannerist painter
Dario Castello (c. 1590 – c. 1658), Italian composer
Felix Castello (1595–1651), Spanish Baroque painter
Giovanni Battista Castello (c. 1500 – c. 1579), Italian painter
 John Castello (1802–1877), Guyanese child actor and journalist
Marie Castello (1915–2008), American psychic
Sebastian Castellio (also spelled Castello, 1515–1563), French theologian
Valerio Castello (1624–1659), Italian Baroque painter

Surnames of Italian origin
Italian-language surnames